Tongan Australians are Australians who are of ethnic Tongan descent or Tongans who hold Australian citizenship.

Background
According to the 2011 Australian census 10,560 Australians were born in Tonga, while 25,096 claimed Tongan ancestry. In 2006, 18,426 claimed Tongan ancestry, either alone or with another ancestry.

History
Tongans were historically subject to the White Australia policy. In 1948, Akanesi Carrick – a cousin of Queen Sālote – and her two children were deported from Australia because of their race, despite being married to a British subject, Stewart Carrick. A Tongan man was deported from Australia in January 1975 because he had entered the country by "posing as a Maori". A decade later, another Tongan man sued the Australian Department of Immigration and Ethnic Affairs for racial discrimination, alleging the department was targeting Pacific Islanders in its administration of immigration law.

Population

Tongan migrants to Australia have tended to make their homes in the "arrival city" suburbs of Sydney's west. This pattern began in the 1970s, intensified in the 1980s, and continues today. However, Tongans aren't exclusively settling in Western Sydney and actually widespread all over Sydney. There are Tongan communities on the Northshore areas of Sydney, such as the Northern beaches, Hornsby & Ryde area, South Sydney & the Eastern Suburbs. As of 2011, over 60% of Tongan-born Australians live in the state of New South Wales.

The 2006 Australian census recorded that the majority of the Tongan Australians (4920 people) live in New South Wales, followed by Victoria (with 1190 people) and Queensland (1090).

Despite there being relatively few Australians of Tongan descent, Tongan Australians have excelled in the football codes of Rugby league and Rugby Union as evidenced by the list of notable Tongan Australians which include:

 Israel Folau, tri-code footballer and dual code international, being a Queensland State of Origin  and Australian international Rugby League representative, AFL convert with GWS, and most recently Rugby Union convert and Australian international Rugby Union representative with the NSW Waratahs Super Rugby club.
 Gorden Tallis, former Brisbane Broncos captain, and Queensland State of Origin and Australian International representative in Rugby League
 Viliami Ofahengaue, affectionately known as Willie O, former Wallaby number eight and Flanker with 41 caps between 1990 and 1998, including the 1991 and 1995 World Cups.

Notable Tongan Australians
 Israel Folau
 David Rodan
 Rodney Blake
 Adam Coleman
 Jim Dymock
 Anthony Fainga'a
 Saia Fainga'a
 Andrew Fifita
 Mahe Fonua
 Tyson Frizell
 Mark Gerrard
 Solomon Haumono
 John Hopoate
 William Hopoate
 Michael Jennings
 Toutai Kefu
 Brent Kite
 Tony Williams
 Leilani Latu
 Hau Latukefu
 Uli Latukefu
 Willie Manu
 Willie Mason
 Feleti Mateo
 Viliami Ofahengaue
 Wycliff Palu
 Tevita Pangai Junior
 Mosese Pangai
 Tatafu Polota-Nau
 George Smith
 Willie Tonga
 Mahe Fonua
 Anthony Tupou
 Jorge Taufua
 Moses Suli
 Manase Fainu
 Brenko Lee
 Tevita Funa
 Haumole Olakauatu
 Kelepi Tanginoa
 Siosaia Vave
 Tony Satini
 Michael Oldfield
 David Fifita
 John Asiata
 Hame Sele
 Keaon Koloamatangi
 Tevita Tatola
 Siosifa Talakai
 Robert Jennings
 George Jennings
 Manase Manuokafoa
 John Folau
 Vai Toutai
 Jim Dymock
 Esikeli Tonga
 Richard Fa'aoso
 Sione Masima
 Taniela Lasalo
 Pat Politoni
 Atelea Vea
 Andrew Emelio
 Samisoni Langi
 Mickey Paea
 Danny Fualalo
 Asipele Fine
 Andrew Tangata-Toa
 Jamil Hopoate
 David Hala
 Andrew Lomu
 Tevita Metuisela
 Sione Kite
 Lelea Paea
 Vika Bull
 Linda Bull

See also
 Tongan New Zealanders
 Australia–Tonga relations

References

Polynesian Australian
 
Tongan diaspora